Inner demons is a phrase used to refer to a person's inner struggles. 

It can also refer to:

Inner Demons, a 2014 found footage film
Europe's Inner Demons, a historical study of the beliefs regarding European witchcraft in Late Medieval and Early Modern Europe
Star Wars: Inner Demons, a 2009 short fan film that premiered at Sci-Fi on the Rock
Inner Demons, henchmen of Marvel Comics villain Mister Negative
D.A. Sebasstian & The Inner Demons, a side project by Kill Switch...Klick frontman D.A. Sebasstian